The 2015 USA Gymnastics elite season consists of the domestic artistic gymnastics events that will take place during the summer of 2015, thus forming the elite season. The season will take place from May 29-August 16, 2015, consisting of four events; two elite qualifiers, one women's classic and the U.S. National Championships. During the elite season, the 2015 Pan American Games are taking place in Toronto, Ontario, Canada. This doesn't clash with any elite season competitions.

Calendar of events 
Below is the calendar of events during the season.

Qualification

Women 

Source:

Participants

References 

2015 in gymnastics
Gymnastics in the United States
2015 in American sports